The Waitakere City Raiders were a New Zealand rugby league club that represented Waitakere City in the Lion Red Cup from 1994 to 1996.

Notable players
Notable players included;Rick Andrew  Anthony Edwards, Boycie Nelson, David Bailey, Ben Lythe, Tony Tuimavave, Robbie and Henry Paul, Willie Swann, Julian O'Neill, Brady Malam, Anthony Swann, Cliff Beverley, Brian Jellick, Fred Robards and Paki Tuimavave.
One of NZ's greatest rugby league referees, Daniel Caddy, also played for the Raiders. An outstanding fullback in his prime, he was once embarrassed on the field when Nigel Vagana stepped around Caddy like he was a 6-year-old child playing his first game of footy. 
Following his career as a player, Caddy became one of this countries most successful referees of the modern era.

Season Results

References

Auckland rugby league clubs
Defunct rugby league teams in New Zealand
Rugby clubs established in 1994
1994 establishments in New Zealand
1996 disestablishments in New Zealand